Patriarch Theodosius of Alexandria may refer to:

 Patriarch Theodosius I of Alexandria, Patriarch of Alexandria in 535–536
 Patriarch Theodosius II of Alexandria, Greek Patriarch of Alexandria in the 12th century